Joaquín Sánchez Rodríguez (born 21 July 1981), known simply as Joaquín, is a Spanish professional footballer who plays for and captains La Liga club Real Betis as a right winger.

He is best known for his pace and acceleration, as well as excellent dribbling and crossing ability. During his career he was mainly associated with Betis and Valencia, appearing in 600 La Liga matches over 19 seasons and scoring 76 goals while winning the Copa del Rey with both clubs (twice with the former). In the competition he also represented Málaga, signing with Fiorentina from Italy in 2013.

Joaquín was capped for Spain on 51 occasions, representing the nation in two World Cups and Euro 2004.

Club career

Betis
Joaquín was born in El Puerto de Santa María, Province of Cádiz. In 1999–2000 he started his senior career, appearing regularly for Real Betis B (after spending two years in the youth ranks) as it was eventually relegated from the Segunda División B. He moved to the first team the following season, making his professional debut on 3 September 2000 and having an immediate impact – 38 matches and three goals – as the Andalusians returned to La Liga after one year out.
 
Subsequently, Joaquín collected well over 200 official appearances for Betis in the next five years, assisting and scoring alike. During 2004–05 he played all the games, scoring five times, and added three goals in the campaign's Copa del Rey; as the final of the latter was played at the Vicente Calderón Stadium on 11 June 2005, he featured the full 90 minutes plus extra time of the 2–1 win against CA Osasuna.

Joaquín appeared in all six group-stage matches in the following season's UEFA Champions League, including the 1–0 victory over Chelsea on 1 November 2005 and a 0–0 draw against Liverpool at Anfield late in the same month (third-place finish, UEFA Cup relegation). On the domestic front, he scored three goals from 35 appearances for the 14th-placed side.

In late July 2006, following a conversation with Joaquín, Betis chairman José León stated that the player had convinced him that he would stay at the club for another year. "It has surprised me a lot,” he admitted. “I came to convince him and on the contrary, he has convinced me", he further added. In mid-August, the player caused shock at the club by declaring in a press conference his intentions to leave.

Valencia

Joaquín was meant to join Valencia CF in early August 2006 for €18 million, in a swap deal that also included Mario Regueiro. However, some difficulties in the payment appeared, along with the Uruguayan's insistence in remaining at Valencia, with the transfer thus being delayed.

Joaquín was loaned to Albacete Balompié as punishment by Betis owner Manuel Ruiz de Lopera, due to the player taking a certain percentage of the transfer fee. Lopera used a clause in his contract whereby he could be loaned to any club if it was decided by Betis (Joaquín travelled to his new club's facilities using his own transport and, to prove that he did so, had himself photographed by operatives working nearby. The switch was subsequently cancelled).

In late August 2006, Joaquín officially moved to Valencia for €25 million, making him the club's most expensive signing to that date as the player penned a five-year contract, with the choice of a further one-year extension. In his first year, he played 35 matches and scored five goals as the Che made it to the Champions League's qualifying rounds.

Joaquín began facing stiff competition for a starting berth in 2009–10, being challenged by younger Pablo Hernández. During the course of the campaign – they also played in the UEFA Europa League – both players received roughly the same number of minutes and scored a similar total of goals.

With the departure of David Villa to FC Barcelona, Joaquín was given the No. 7 shirt for 2010–11. He led the scoring charts after the first round, netting twice in a 3–1 win at Málaga CF. On 12 February 2011 he scored another brace, helping Valencia come from behind at Atlético Madrid to win 2–1, eventually finishing third and qualifying for the Champions League.

Málaga

On 24 June 2011, Joaquín signed with Málaga for three years, for a fee of €4 million. He made his debut for the club on 28 August in a 2–1 away loss against Sevilla FC, and opened his scoring account by netting twice in another local derby, a 4–0 home defeat of Granada CF.

In two home games in October 2012 separated by only four days, Joaquín scored to give his team the final win, on both occasions after having missed a penalty: he started against Real Valladolid (2–1) then netted the match's only against A.C. Milan in the Champions League group stage.

Fiorentina
On 13 June 2013, aged nearly 32, Joaquín moved abroad for the first time, agreeing a three-year deal with Italy's ACF Fiorentina. He made his competitive debut for his new team on 29 August, starting in a 1–0 home loss against Grasshopper Club Zürich in the Europa League playoff round.

Joaquín's first goal for the Viola came as a substitute on 20 October 2013, in a 4–2 home win over Serie A champions Juventus FC, and his second of the league season was the only in a victory at S.S.C. Napoli the following 23 March. He also played a part in the team's run to the final of the Coppa Italia, netting in a 2–0 home win over A.C. ChievoVerona in the last 16.

Return to Betis
On 31 August 2015, Joaquín returned to Betis by signing a three-year contract. In 2017, he acquired a 2% share in his first club.

Joaquín found the net in a 1–1 draw against Getafe CF on 15 September 2019, marking his 400th appearance for the green-and-whites – he also drew level with Julio Cardeñosa as the player with most Spanish top-tier appearances for Betis with 307. On 8 December, he scored an 18-minute hat-trick (the first of his long career) in a 3–2 home win over Athletic Bilbao, becoming the oldest player ever to achieve the feat in La Liga at the age of 38 years and 140 days, breaking the previous record of 37 years set by Alfredo Di Stéfano in 1964. At the end of the year, he agreed to an extension until 2021.

On 16 July 2020, in a 2–1 home loss to Deportivo Alavés, Joaquín made his 551st Spanish top division appearance, thereby surpassing Raúl as the outfield player with the most games in the competition; only goalkeeper Andoni Zubizarreta remained ahead of him, on 622. On 15 September 2022, after scoring in the 3–2 defeat of PFC Ludogorets Razgrad in the group stage, he became the oldest player to achieve the feat in the history of the Europa League at 41 years and 56 days.

International career
Joaquín made his debut for the Spain national team on 13 February 2002 against Portugal, in a 1–1 friendly played in Barcelona. Brilliant club form for Betis saw him get called up for that year's FIFA World Cup, where he appeared twice: in his second match, the quarter-finals against co-hosts South Korea, he was involved in a couple of debatable decisions, including one incident where the linesman raised his flag for a goal kick as Joaquín was crossing a ball to Fernando Morientes, who was denied a golden goal – the argument was that the ball had crossed the line. However, replays showed that it did not; the game then went to penalties, and he was chosen to take his team's fourth attempt – despite carrying an injury – which was blocked by Lee Woon-jae.

Joaquín played again for the nation through their premature exit at UEFA Euro 2004, also being selected for the 2006 World Cup. He totalled five appearances, but was not first choice at either competition, only starting twice overall.

During the early stages of the Euro 2008 qualification campaign, Spain lost 3–2 against Northern Ireland. After the match, Joaquín told in a Spanish radio interview: "Right now, the national team is a mess, chaos and Luis doesn't know how to handle it in these difficult moments. I know that what I'm saying is not going to help me get back into the national team, but it's what I feel." He later commented, "The only thing I wanted to say is that these are not clear times for the national squad after losing to Northern Ireland .... but it was not my intention to attack the team or Luis Aragonés". Subsequently, he failed to be selected again as the national side went on to record 35 consecutive games without defeat, winning a record 15 consecutive times and lifting the Euro 2008, 2010 World Cup and Euro 2012 trophies.

Personal life
Joaquín grew up in a big family, with eight brothers and sisters in total. As the third child, he had two elder brothers. Three of the eight children in this family are or have been engaged in football: besides Joaquín, his elder brother Lucas played for Cádiz CF, and his brother Ricardo also played in Betis' youth ranks.

Growing up, Joaquín wanted to be a bullfighter. Joaquín's uncle, nicknamed "El Chino", firmly believed in Joaquín's talent and paid for his daily round trip between Cádiz and Seville when Joaquín was in Betis' youth system. El Chino died in 2002, and since then Joaquín has dedicated most of his achievements to him remembered him as his mentor.

After the 2005 domestic cup conquest, Joaquín married Susana Saborido on 8 July. The trophy was present at the ceremony, as was the entire Betis squad.

In October 2022, after a long and successful presence on television and social media, he made his debut as a TV host in prime time, with El novato, an interview program with popular personalities with a wide audience since its inception.

Career statistics

Club

International

Scores and results list Spain's goal tally first, score column indicates score after each Joaquín goal.

Honours
Betis
Copa del Rey: 2004–05, 2021–22

Valencia
Copa del Rey: 2007–08

Fiorentina
Coppa Italia runner-up: 2013–14

Individual
FIFA World Cup All-Star Team: 2002 (reserve)
La Liga Breakthrough Player of the Year: 2002

See also
List of La Liga players (400+ appearances)
List of Real Betis players (+100 appearances)
List of Valencia CF players (+100 appearances)

References

External links

CiberChe stats and bio 

1981 births
Living people
People from El Puerto de Santa María
Sportspeople from the Province of Cádiz
Spanish footballers
Footballers from Andalusia
Association football wingers
La Liga players
Segunda División players
Segunda División B players
Betis Deportivo Balompié footballers
Real Betis players
Valencia CF players
Málaga CF players
Serie A players
ACF Fiorentina players
Spain youth international footballers
Spain under-21 international footballers
Spain international footballers
2002 FIFA World Cup players
2006 FIFA World Cup players
UEFA Euro 2004 players
Spanish expatriate footballers
Expatriate footballers in Italy
Spanish expatriate sportspeople in Italy